The 2002 season was the Carolina Panthers' eighth in the National Football League and their first under head coach John Fox.  They tried to improve upon their 1–15 record in 2001, and make it to the playoffs for the second time in franchise history.

After moving from the NFC West to the more geographically accurate NFC South, they improved by six games to finish 7–9, but were still five games behind the division champion Tampa Bay Buccaneers and failed to make the playoffs. As of the 2021 season, their week 12, 41–0 loss against the Atlanta Falcons is the last time the Panthers have been shutout in any game.

Offseason

NFL Draft

The 2002 NFL Draft took place at Radio City Music Hall in New York City on April 15 and April 16, 2002. The Panthers selected nine players in seven rounds. Despite having the worst record in the league the previous season, the Panthers picked 2nd overall due to the Houston Texans picking first overall in  their inaugural draft, as is tradition with expansion teams.

NFL Draft

Personnel

Staff

Roster

|Practice Squad=|Active=53|Inactive=14}}

Regular season

Schedule
Under the NFL’s new scheduling formula put in place for this season, the Panthers would play two games each season against their NFC South division rivals. A schedule rotation would see them play the NFC North in full in 2002 and every three seasons subsequently, and the AFC North in 2002 and every four seasons subsequently. As the Panthers had the worst record in the NFL in 2001, they would also play the Arizona Cardinals, who had the worst 2001 record amongst teams in the reconstituted NFC West, and the Dallas Cowboys, who had the worst 2001 record amongst teams in the NFC East.

Game summaries

Week 2: vs. Detroit Lions

Week 3: at Minnesota Vikings

Week 4: at Green Bay Packers

Week 16: vs. Chicago Bears

Standings

References

Carolina Panthers seasons
Carolina Panthers Season, 2002
Carolina